Charlwood is a given name and surname. Notable people with the name include:

Alexander Charlwood (1888–1974), English cricketer
Charlwood Lawton (1660–1721), English lawyer and pamphleteer
Charles Charlwood (1842–1880), English cricketer
Don Charlwood (1915–2012), Australian author
Henry Charlwood (1846–1888), English cricketer
John Charlwood (1871–1923), English cricketer
U. Gary Charlwood (born 1941), German-born Canadian businessman

See also
Charlwood, Surrey, England
Charlwood (disambiguation)